The 1931 LEN European Aquatics Championships were held from 23 to 30 August in Paris, France.

Medal table

Medal summary

Diving
Men's events

Women's events

Swimming
Men's events

Women's events

Legend: WR – World record

Water polo

See also
List of European Championships records in swimming

References

European Championships
European Aquatics Championships
LEN European Aquatics Championships
International aquatics competitions hosted by France
European Aquatics
1931 in Paris
August 1931 sports events